This is the list of episodes for The Late Late Show with Craig Ferguson in 2010.

2010

References

External links
 Craig Ferguson on Twitter
 The Late Late Show with Craig Ferguson at CBS
 The Late Late Show with Craig Ferguson on Twitter
 The Late Late Show with Craig Ferguson on Facebook